Luke is a rural mountain village in the municipality of Kriva Palanka, North Macedonia. It is located closed to the border with Serbia and Bulgaria.

Name
The name Luke is believed to be a German, originating from German word "die Luke" as in this region the Saxons settled in the 13th Century and mixed with local Slavic population.

Demographics
According to the 2002 census, the village had a total of 338 inhabitants. Ethnic groups in the village include:

Macedonians 337
Serbs 1

References

Villages in Kriva Palanka Municipality
Bulgaria–North Macedonia border crossings
North Macedonia–Serbia border crossings